Babatunde Fowler (born 12 August 1956) is a Nigerian public officer, tax administrator and social reformer. He was the executive chairman Lagos State Board of Internal Revenue and Chief Executive Officer Lagos State Internal Revenue Service. He is the former executive chairman of the Federal Inland Revenue Service (FIRS).

Career 
The Board of internal revenue became autonomous and self-accounting with the passage into law in January 2006 of the Lagos State Revenue Administration Law and Fowler was appointed as the first CEO of the Lagos State Internal Revenue Service and executive chairman of the Lagos State Board of Internal Revenue.

With this re-engineering, the new Lagos State Board of Internal Revenue has achieved a sharp increase in Internally Generated Revenue (IGR) from an average of ₦3.6 billion per month in January 2006 to an average of over ₦20.5 billion per month in 2014. 

Declining tax revenues since 2015, a lavish lifestyle, and whispered accusations of outright corruption were suspected to be behind the announcement on 9 December 2019 of President Muhammadu Buhari declining to renew his appointment as executive chairman of the Federal Inland Revenue Service (FIRS).

Advocacy 
Foweler advocates for less dependence on oil.
The position was reiterated by him at an international conference where he warned the Federal Government of Nigeria that  the "drastic drop in revenue had a negative impact on the balance in the federation account and by extension the amount accruing to the three tiers of government (in Nigeria) during the year 2009". In stimulating interest and raising awareness on tax education at an early stage in life, Fowler introduced a competition for pupils which is funded by his board in which winners are given cash awards and scholarships.

References 

Living people
Businesspeople from Lagos
Nigerian politicians
Yoruba politicians
1956 births
California State University, Dominguez Hills alumni
California State University, Los Angeles alumni
University of Wisconsin–Whitewater alumni
Nigerian bankers
Yoruba bankers
Nigerian expatriates in the United States
Nigerian chief executives